Aurora is a city in Cloud County, Kansas, United States.  As of the 2020 census, the population of the city was 56.

History

In 1887, Atchison, Topeka and Santa Fe Railway built a branch line from Neva (3 miles west of Strong City) through Aurora to Superior, Nebraska.  In 1996, the Atchison, Topeka and Santa Fe Railway merged with Burlington Northern Railroad and renamed to the current BNSF Railway.  Most locals still refer to this railroad as the "Santa Fe".

Aurora was named by settlers who came from Aurora, Illinois.

The first post office was established in Aurora in 1886, but from 1886 until 1888, the post office was called St. Peter.

Geography
Aurora is located at  (39.451641, -97.530396).

Demographics

2010 census
As of the census of 2010, there were 60 people, 24 households, and 17 families living in the city. The racial makeup of the city was 96.7% White and 3.3% Native American.

There were 24 households, of which 37.5% had children under the age of 18 living with them, 54.2% were married couples living together, 8.3% had a female householder with no husband present, 8.3% had a male householder with no wife present, and 29.2% were non-families. 29.2% of all households were made up of individuals, and 12.5% had someone living alone who was 65 years of age or older. The average household size was 2.50 and the average family size was 2.82.

The median age in the city was 38 years. 33.3% of residents were under the age of 18; 3.5% were between the ages of 18 and 24; 25% were from 25 to 44; 26.7% were from 45 to 64; and 11.7% were 65 years of age or older. The gender makeup of the city was 53.3% male and 46.7% female.

2000 census
As of the census of 2000, there were 79 people, 33 households, and 23 families living in the city. The racial makeup of the city was 98.73% White and 1.27% Native American.

There were 33 households, out of which 30.3% had children under the age of 18 living with them, 63.6% were married couples living together, 3.0% had a female householder with no husband present, and 27.3% were non-families. 27.3% of all households were made up of individuals, and 3.0% had someone living alone who was 65 years of age or older. The average household size was 2.39 and the average family size was 2.79.

In the city, the population was spread out, with 27.8% under the age of 18, 8.9% from 18 to 24, 29.1% from 25 to 44, 15.2% from 45 to 64, and 19.0% who were 65 years of age or older. The median age was 38 years. For every 100 females, there were 132.4 males. For every 100 females age 18 and over, there were 119.2 males.

The median income for a household in the city was $29,583, and the median income for a family was $51,667. Males had a median income of $28,125 versus $16,250 for females. The per capita income for the city was $24,213. There were no families and 9.0% of the population living below the poverty line, including no under eighteens and 8.3% of those over 64.

Education
The community is served by Concordia USD 333 public school district.  The Concordia High School mascot is Panthers.

References

Further reading

External links
 Aurora - Directory of Public Officials
 Aurora city map, KDOT

Cities in Kansas
Cities in Cloud County, Kansas